"Día de Enero" (English: "Day in January") is the third single released from Shakira's sixth studio album , following "La Tortura" and "No".

Background and composition
Written and composed by Shakira herself, "" is a love song that tells about how she met her former boyfriend, Antonio de la Rúa on a day in January. The song also makes reference to two famous comics characters "Mutt and Jeff"  known in Spanish as "Eneas and Benitín."

Music video

The accompanying music video for the song was directed by Shakira's longtime collaborator, Jaume de Laiguana. It was shot at a beach in California, in an attempt to reflect part of the singer's daily life. The video was premiered worldwide on 27 February 2006. It shows Shakira walking along a beach at sunset. She also draws a heart in the sand with the letters "S y A" symbolising her love for her then-fiancée, Antonio de la Rúa. The video was included on Oral Fixation Volumes 1 & 2 bonus DVD, and the Spanish edition of Oral Fixation Tour.

Chart performance
The song peaked within the Top 40 in the Billboard Hot Latin Tracks chart. The song fared well elsewhere, especially in South America.

References 

2005 singles
Shakira songs
Spanish-language songs
Songs written by Shakira
Pop ballads
Rock ballads
Song recordings produced by Lester Mendez